The SIAI S.13 was an Italian biplane reconnaissance flying-boat from 1919.

Design and development
Designed by the Società Idrovolanti Alta Italia (SIAI) as a smaller version of the earlier S.12, the S.13 was a single-engine biplane reconnaissance-fighter flying boat powered by a  Isotta Fraschini V.6 engine. It had a crew of two in side-by-side seats behind a single windscreen; the observer had a single  machine gun.

Emile Taddéoli, a Swiss flight pioneer was hired as test pilot for Savoia in mid-1914. On 12 July 1919, with a passenger on board, he flew from Calende on Lago Maggiore to Lake Geneva in 110 minutes, overflying the Mont Blanc massif in a SIAI S.13.

The Royal Italian Navy took delivery of 12 aircraft in 1919, and examples were exported to Japan, Norway, Spain, Sweden, and Yugoslavia. In France, the S.13 was built under license as the CAMS C.13 and the Spanish naval workshops in Barcelona also built seven under licence.

A single-seat version, the S.13 Tipo, was ordered by the Royal Italian Navy, but was later cancelled when the Royal Navy decided to develop the Macchi M.7 instead and a civilian version, the S.13bis, failed to attract any orders.

Variants

S.13
Production flying boat
S.13 Tipo
Single-seat variant, not built.
S.13bis
Civil variant, not built.
CAMS C-13
French licence-built S.13

Operators
 (as CAMS C-13)
Aéronavale

Regia Marina

Imperial Japanese Navy Air Service

Royal Norwegian Navy Air Service

Spanish Air Force

Swedish Navy (Marinens Flygväsen)

Royal Yugoslav Navy

Specifications (S13)

See also

References

 

  (also page 47)

S.13
1910s Italian military reconnaissance aircraft
Flying boats
Single-engined pusher aircraft
Biplanes
Aircraft first flown in 1919